Personal jurisdiction calendars of the Roman Rite of the Catholic Church are lists of saints' feast days and other liturgical celebrations, organized by calendar date, that apply to members of individual personal ordinariates and personal prelatures that worship according to the Roman Rite of the Latin Church. Such calendars are "particular calendars" that build off of the General Roman Calendar.

Personal Ordinariates

Chair of St. Peter 

In addition to the national calendar of the United States, the Personal Ordinariate of the Chair of Saint Peter contains a number of saints from the British Isles in its liturgical calendar; this calendar now supplants the former one used by Anglican Use Catholics in the United States prior to 2015.

Our Lady of Walsingham

See also 
 General Roman Calendar
 National calendars of the Roman Rite
 Institutional and societal calendars of the Roman Rite

Notes

References 

Liturgical calendars of the Catholic Church